Ye Shipin (born 1959) is a Singaporean drama actor.

Filmography
The Golden Pillow  金枕頭 (1995)
Dr Justice II  法醫故事II (1995)
Tofu Street  豆腐街 (1996)
The Unbroken Cycle  解連環 (1996)
Triad Justice  飛越珍珠坊 (1996)
Marriage, Dollars and Sense  5C老公 (1996)
The Silver Lining  驟雨驕陽 (1997)
The Prime Years  創業興家 (1997)
Act 235  刑事235 (1998)
Wok of Life  福满人间 (1999)
In Pursuit of Peace  何日军在来 (2001)
Beyond the Axis of Truth  法医X档案 (2001)
The Hotel  大酒店 (2001)
Zero to Hero  阴差阳错 (2005)
Beyond the Axis of Truth II  法医X档案II (2005)
C.I.D  刑警2人组 (2006)
Mars VS Venus  幸福双人床 (2007)
Live Again  天堂鳥 (2008)
Prosperity  喜事年年 (2011)
Mind Game  心迷 (2015)

References

1959 births
20th-century Singaporean male actors
21st-century Singaporean male actors
Singaporean male television actors
Living people